Los Llares is a town in the Arenas de Iguña municipality of the Spanish region of Cantabria. In the year 2004 the population of los Llares was 45. The hermitage of the Virgin of the Moral can be found where the valleys of Iguña and Cabuérniga meet in los Llares.

References

Towns in Spain